Top Girl may refer to:

Top Girls, play by Caryl Churchill
Top Girls Fassa Bortolo
Top Girl (film) (:it:Top Girl) 1996 redirects to Joe D'Amato
Top Girl (magazine) redirects to List of assets owned by Bertelsmann
Top Girl (TV series) redirects to Top Girl – Georgia's Next Top Model
Top Girl (game) redirects to CrowdStar
Top Girl (Gina Choi EP)
"Top Girl", Korean-language song from Top Girl (Gina Choi EP)